The Mexican National Cruiserweight Championship (Campeonato Nacional Crucero in Spanish) is a national Mexican singles professional wrestling championship controlled by Comisión de Box y Lucha Libre Mexico D.F. (Mexico City Boxing and Wrestling Commission). From its establishment in 1983, no one promotion promoted the championship but was shared between several Mexican promotions, and not exclusively by Empresa Mexicana de Lucha Libre (EMLL). In the mid-1990s AAA gained primary booking control of the championship. Being a professional wrestling championship,  it was not won legitimately but via a scripted ending to a match or awarded to a wrestler because of a storyline.

Ángel Blanco became the first National Cruiserweight Champion when he won the inaugural tournament on November 13, 1984, defeating Insolito in the final. In the mid-1990s AAA gained control of the championship when title holder Blue Demon Jr. began working for AAA full-time. When Blue Demon Jr. lost the Cruiserweight Championship to Karis La Momia AAA took full control of the Championship. In 1996 Karis la Momia changed his ring character to La Parka Jr. and had to vacate the title since his history working as Karis was not publicly acknowledged by AAA at the time. In 1999 La Parka regained the title, becoming the only two-time champion. The title was seldom defended since from the early 2000s and it was officially vacated by AAA on December 8, 2008.

History
The Comisión de Box y Lucha Libre Mexico D.F. (Mexico City Boxing and Wrestling Commission) sanctioned a Mexican National Cruiserweight Championship in late 1983, allowing the Universal Wrestling Association (UWA) to host a tournament for the inaugural champion. Records are unclear as to who participated in the tournament, only that Ángel Blanco defeated Insoliton on November 13, 1984. Different sources list the end of the second reign by Adorable Rubí on different dates. The Royal and Will book "Wrestling title histories: professional wrestling champions around the world from the 19th century to the present", documents that Rubí vacated the championship on September 10, 1985. More current, online sources, such as CageMatch and Wrestling Data list that the reign was ended by Charro de Jalisco on October 24, 1986. In 1992, the reigning title holder Destructor de Idolos was forced to vacate the championship because of an injury that meant he was unable to defend the title. Rock el Cavernicolo defeated Dinamico to win the vacant championship. On May 15, 1996, Karis la Momia won the championship from Blue Demon Jr., only to relinquish it in November as he stopped working as Karis la Momia and changed his ring name to La Parka Jr. He would later regain the championship, making him the only person to hold the championship twice. La Parka Jr. did not defend the championship from winning it in 1999, until December 2008, where AAA abandoned all of the Mexican National Championships that they were promoting.

Reigns

A total of twelve wrestlers have held the championship throughout its history, with only one person having held it twice, La Parka Jr., who first won the title under the ring name Karis la Momia. The Mexican National Cruiserweight Championship has been inactive since December 8, 2008 when AAA stopped promoting all of their Mexican National championships, in favor of AAA branded championships. They later introduced the AAA World Cruiserweight Championship in May 2009. While the championship has been inactive since 2008, there were plans to revive it in February 2013, when it was announced that Xtreme Tiger would wrestle Rey Astral for the vacant championship on February 23. The match never took place and the championship has not been seen since then. La Parka Jr.'s second reign set a longevity record, lasting 3,591 days, from 1999 until 2008. The shortest reign belonged to Charro de Jalisco, who held it for 65 days.

Rules
The cruiserweight championship is classified as a "National" title, which means that officially non-Mexican citizens are prohibited from challenging or holding the championship, just like all other Mexican National Championships. The weight limits have not always been strictly enforced.

As with all professional wrestling championships, matches for the Mexican National Cruiserweight Championship were not won or lost competitively, but by a pre-planned ending to a match, with the outcome determined by the CMLL bookers and matchmakers. On occasion, a promotion declared the championship vacant, which meant there was no title holder at that point in time. This was either due to a storyline, or real-life issues such as a champion suffering an injury being unable to defend the title, or leaving the company. All title matches took place under two out of three falls rules.

Title history

Reigns by combined length
Key

Footnotes

References

Cruiserweight wrestling championships
Mexican national wrestling championships
National professional wrestling championships